The Philippine five-peso coin (₱5) is the third-largest denomination of the coins of the Philippine peso.

Three versions of the coin are in circulation, the version from the BSP Series which was issued from 1995 to 2017, the original round coin from the New Generation Currency Coin Series issued from 2017 to 2019 and the nonagonal (9-sided shape) version since 2019. The reverse side depicts the Tayabak, a type of Philippine vine and the current logo of the Bangko Sentral ng Pilipinas.

Firstly, the five peso coin was produced in conjunction along with the five peso note, which commenced from the year 1975 to 1982 and again in 1991 to 1995. However, production for the five peso note became obsolete when the Bangko Sentral ng Pilipinas (BSP) stopped printing the banknotes in 1995.

History

Independence

Ang Bagong Lipunan Series 
From 1975 to 1982, a five peso coin was introduced by the Bangko Sentral ng Pilipinas in line with the new 'Ang Bagong Lipunan' series issued in commemoration of Fedinand Marcos' declaration of Martial Law. The obverse bears the inscription 'Ang Bagong Lipunan,' year of minting, and a profile of the late President Ferdinand Marcos, who was the president throughout the circulation of the coins, faced to the left. Marcos himself approved the coins with his own face. The denomination, the inscription 'Republika ng Pilipinas' and its official coat of arms, are all on the reverse. This coin rarely circulated due to its large size and since it coexisted with the 2-peso and 5-peso notes.

Flora and Fauna Series 
From 1991 to 1994, a new five peso coin was issued. The obverse now features the inscription 'Republika ng Pilipinas' and a profile of Emilio Aguinaldo, a Filipino revolutionary, politician, and a military leader officially recognized as the first president of the Philippines, now faced to the right. An enlarged denomination and an image of the flower of the Pterocarpus indicus or narra tree, the official national tree of the Philippines, are all on the reverse.

BSP Coin Series 
Issued in 1995, the current version of the coin now features the enlarged denomination on the obverse, while the inscription 'Bangko Sentral ng Pilipinas' and its official seal are all on the reverse. The reed on its edge was also removed.

New Generation Currency Coin Series 
Issued on November 30, 2017, on both the 120th anniversary of the death and 154th birthday of Andrés Bonifacio, the new five peso coin was released ahead of the other denominations of the new currency series. It has been given new features to prevent counterfeiting. The obverse features Filipino revolutionary leader Andrés Bonifacio, and the reverse depicts a tayabak, a type of Filipino vine. The coin's design was criticized for being too similar to the ₱1 coin, since they are both colour silver, circular, and nearly the same size. However, it was also praised for inputting national hero Andrés Bonifacio and replacing Emilio Aguinaldo, who ordered Bonifacio's execution during the Philippine Revolution.

In September 2019, Benjamin Diokno, the current BSP Governor, announced that due to the confusion between the ₱5 coin and the ₱1 coin, a new "enhanced" ₱5 coin would be released in December 2019. It was initially described as being scallop-edged but a later report on 29 November 2019 showed it as nonagon-shaped, with the rim being scalloped in the inside.

Version history

Commemorative coins
On December 19, 2014, the Bangko Sentral ng Pilipinas (BSP) published an announcement that three new limited edition commemorative coins is to be circulated, which was then released on Monday, 22 December 2014. This includes the Bagong Bayani Commemorative Coin and the 70th anniversary Leyte Landing commemorative five-peso coin.

See also

Philippine five peso note

References

Currencies of the Philippines
Five-base-unit coins